Zhuhai Special Economic Zone (Chinese: 珠海经济特区), established on 5 August 1980, is one of the five special economic zones in the People's Republic of China. Originally comprising a territory of 6.1 km2 in Zhuhai City, it was expanded to 15.16 km2 on  29 June 1983, and 121 km2 on 5 April 1989.

See also

Shenzhen Special Economic Zone

External links 

Zhuhai
Special Economic Zones of China
1980 establishments in China